Doki Doki Literature Club! (DDLC) is a 2017 freeware visual novel developed by American independent game studio Team Salvato for Linux, macOS, and Windows. The game was initially distributed through itch.io, and later became available on Steam. The story is told from the perspective of a high school student who reluctantly joins the school's literature club on the insistence of his childhood best friend, and is given the option to romantically pursue three of its four female members. Doki Doki Literature Club! features a non-traditional plot structure with multiple endings and unlockable cutscenes with each of the main characters. Although the game initially appears to be a lighthearted dating simulator, it is in fact a pyschological horror game that extensively breaks the fourth wall.

The game was developed in an estimated two-year period by a team led by Dan Salvato, previously known for his modding work as part of Project M. According to Salvato, the inspiration for the game came from his mixed feelings toward anime and a fascination for surreal and unsettling experiences. Upon its release, Doki Doki Literature Club! received positive critical attention for its successful use of horror elements and unconventional nature within the visual novel genre. The game also inspired various internet memes and achieved a large online following.

An expanded version of the game, Doki Doki Literature Club Plus!, was released for the Nintendo Switch, PlayStation 4, PlayStation 5, Windows, Xbox One, and Xbox Series X/S on June 30, 2021. A macOS version of the game was later released on August 12, 2021. It received generally positive reviews, with praise for its side stories and gameplay on consoles, but some criticism for its lack of changes. Unlike the original 2017 release, Plus! is a premium game.

Gameplay

Doki Doki Literature Club! is a visual novel. As such, its gameplay has a low level of interactivity and consists of scenes with static two-dimensional images of characters in a first-person perspective, accompanied by occasional choices the player is forced to make in order to advance the plot. The descriptions and dialogue are depicted in the form of accompanying text without voice acting. The game's narration is provided by the game's protagonist (whom the player controls), a member of the titular literature club, to which he was invited by his childhood friend Sayori. Any decisions the player is advocated to make over the course of the plot affect the development of the protagonist's relationships with key female characters Sayori, Yuri, and Natsuki, but ultimately have little effect on the outcome of the game. The characters' interactions with the protagonist are primarily influenced by a minigame in which the player is required to compose a poem from a set of randomly selected individual words. Each girl in the literature club has different word preferences, and will react positively when the player picks a word that they like. The characters' reactions are stylized in the form of miniature chibi avatars of the characters which are displayed at the bottom of the screen during the minigame, and which will jump given the opportunity as a response to the player selecting one of their favorite words; Monika is not able to be romanced in this way, which later affects the plot of the game. Depending on the results of these minigames, the player will experience scenes for whatever character liked that particular poem the most. The narrative is divided into three acts and an epilogue, with the game restarting each time. At a certain point, the player must manipulate the game's files in order to advance the narrative.

Doki Doki Literature Club Plus! features the entire main campaign of the original game, but includes a "virtual desktop" allowing access to character files without needing to manipulate computer files, as well as unlockable images, soundtrack, story-related content, and several new "side stories". The new content is unlocked by completing the main campaign, as well as the side stories. The new stories depict characterization of the relationships between the four club members, as well as the formation of the literature club, without any interaction from the player.

Plot
The main protagonist is invited by his cheerful childhood friend Sayori to join their high school's literature club as a remedy for his insular nature. He reluctantly agrees to her proposal and meets the other members of the club: the assertive Natsuki, the shy Yuri, and the bubbly club president Monika. After each day passes in the literature club, the club members are prompted to compose a poem which they share with the other members the following day. Eventually, as the club prepares for the school's upcoming cultural festival in which the club members intend to share their poems with a wider audience, Sayori confides to the protagonist that she suffers from depression. The protagonist assists either Yuri or Natsuki with their tasks, with each attempting to kiss the protagonist before he encounters Sayori again. The protagonist can either confess to Sayori or friend zone her in this moment. Regardless, the following day, Monika passively shows the protagonist an uncharacteristically morbid poem by Sayori that insistently orders someone to "get out of her head". Realizing that something has happened to her, the protagonist rushes to Sayori's home where he discovers that she has hanged herself, and the game abruptly ends.

The player is sent back to the main menu, with all previous save files corrupted and eventually deleted. The narrative repeats upon the start of a new game, but Sayori is glaringly absent and the characters do not remember her existence. Monika introduces the protagonist to the club in lieu of Sayori. Events proceed similarly to the original playthrough, but some text is rendered illegible, the character sprites appear corrupted from time to time, and what appear to be computer glitches or bugs become commonplace. Aside from the game's frequent distortions, it is revealed through dialogue and unlockable "special poems" that Natsuki is malnourished and being abused by her father, and Yuri gradually becomes unstable, obsessive, and prone to self-harm. When the planning stage for the cultural festival is reached, a heated quarrel over who the protagonist will help with the festival breaks out. After the player is forced to choose Monika, Yuri ejects her and Natsuki from the room and privately confesses her love for the protagonist. Whether or not the protagonist accepts Yuri's confession, she commits suicide by stabbing herself. The game's broken script forces the protagonist to stay and watch Yuri's corpse slowly decompose over the course of the weekend. When Natsuki returns upon the script resetting, she is horrified and nauseated at the sight of Yuri's body and flees the scene. Monika then appears and apologizes to the protagonist for the "boring" weekend he had spent, compensating by deleting Yuri and Natsuki's character files from existence and restarting the game.

The protagonist is placed in what remains of the literature club classroom with Monika seated across from him. Monika reveals that she has become self-aware, having acquired the ability to manipulate the game's code after gaining sentience. Distraught at the fact that she is not a romance option but merely a supporting bystander, she used her ability to amplify her clubmates' negative traits in a futile attempt to make them unlikable and prevent their confessions of love for the protagonist. She then obsessively confesses her own love, not to the protagonist, but to the player, because they are real and autonomous rather than programmed. Monika will sit and talk to the player indefinitely about various topics until the player manually enters the game's directory and deletes Monika's character file. Monika initially lashes out at the player as she disappears but ultimately forgives them and remorsefully repents by restoring the game and the characters excluding herself.

Endings
Depending on the course of action taken by the player, the game can come to two possible conclusions during the epilogue. The traditional ending sees Sayori introducing herself as the president of the literature club and expressing her gratitude to the player for dispelling Monika. However, Sayori promptly adopts Monika's characteristics as the new club president. Monika intervenes via text prompt and removes Sayori from the game to save the player. Upon realizing that her efforts to make amends have been fruitless, Monika deletes the whole game as the end credits roll, while she plays a song called "Your Reality" that she wrote for the player. The game concludes with a note from Monika herself, stating that she has disbanded the literature club because "no happiness can be found" in it.

A more positive ending occurs if the player has viewed all of the optional cutscenes and confessed to Sayori prior to witnessing her suicide, which requires saving and loading several times before that point. Though still self-aware, Sayori instead expresses her gratitude to the player for emotionally supporting all the club members, tearfully bids farewell, and assures the player that all the club members love them. Monika then plays "Your Reality" during the credits, albeit without deleting the game. After the game locks, the player is presented with a message from the game's developer, Dan Salvato, describing his intentions behind creating the game and his opinions on video games as a whole.

An earlier ending occurs if the player preemptively deletes Monika's file from the directory before starting a new game. Sayori is subsequently made the default leader of the club. Upon realizing the true nature of the game and her role in it, Sayori panics and forcefully closes the game. Opening the game again will display an image of Sayori having hanged herself.

Doki Doki Literature Club Plus!
In addition to the entire main story, Doki Doki Literature Club Plus! features six additional side stories, entitled Trust, Understanding, Respect, Balance, Reflection, and Self-Love, as well as an additional shorter seventh story, Equals. The stories depict the meeting and relationships between the four club members, as well as the formation of the club up until the beginning of the main campaign, with each of the first six stories focusing on a conflict and resolution between two of the characters and the seventh focusing on the friendship between all four of them. Unlike the main campaign, the side stories do not feature any horror elements or discussion of sentience among any of the characters.

As a fictionalized account of how the game was developed, other story-related content is accessible from within the virtual desktop in the form of an email inbox for a company referred to as "Metaverse Enterprise Solutions", as well as within the virtual desktop's file folder. Collecting this content tells of a group of researchers from the company who were attempting to utilize a virtual machine referred to as "VM1" to create a simulated universe. The resulting universe contained four entities, one of whom, "A", is granted elevated permissions to access the kernel code, referred to as "Monitor Kernel Access". The universe and entities are studied during events paralleling those of the game's main campaign, and the emails and files discuss the researcher's observations and monitoring of the events, with the stated goal being to observe how "A" would react to the discovery of their artificial existence, in order to analyze the possibility of the true universe being a simulation. Later discussion is given on the creation of a second "control" universe within VM1, in which "A" is not made aware of their elevated permissions, paralleling the events and settings of the side stories. It is later mentioned that a small group of researchers, who initially refer to themselves as "Team Salvation", plan to transform the contents of VM1 into a visual novel format in order to ensure security of the project, implying that the events of Doki Doki Literature Club Plus! depict the contents of both universes within VM1.

The last unlockable email describes a second virtual machine, "VM2", which the researchers successfully built but could not reliably access due to its instability. While they are unable to create a reliable connection to VM2, the researchers observe that the entities within VM2 appeared to be working on an undescribed project, referred to as "Project Libitina", which is implied to be an attempt by the entities at accessing the world beyond their simulated universe. If the player completes full "data collection", which requires completing all game content and unlocking all secrets, they are granted access to an eighth side story entitled test.vm, which consists only of a screen describing a failed server attempt at accessing VM2, alongside one of several hundred different randomly-selected sentences, which appear to describe the world and activities within VM2's universe.

Development
Doki Doki Literature Club! was developed by American programmer Dan Salvato over the course of approximately two years, and is his debut title in the video game industry.<ref name="interview">{{cite web|url=https://kotaku.com/doki-doki-literature-clubs-horror-was-born-from-a-love-1819724999 |title=Doki Doki Literature Club'''s Horror Was Born From A Love-Hate Relationship With Anime |last=Jackson|first=Gita|date=October 20, 2017 |work=Kotaku |access-date=October 29, 2017 |archive-url=https://web.archive.org/web/20171021235436/https://kotaku.com/doki-doki-literature-clubs-horror-was-born-from-a-love-1819724999 |archive-date=October 21, 2017 |url-status=live |df=mdy-all}}</ref> Prior to its release, Salvato was known for creating the FrankerFaceZ extension for Twitch, his modding work in the Super Smash Bros. scene, and for his custom Super Mario Maker levels. Salvato was inspired to create a visual novel by his "love-hate relationship" with anime, and emphasized the abundant use of clichés in the genre and the frequent plots centering around "cute girls doing cute things", which he saw as both an asset and a detriment to the viewer's enjoyment. Salvato sought to create a title that would attract the player's attention regardless of how they personally view anime.

Discussing the horror elements of the game, Salvato explained that he was inspired by "things that are scary because they make you uncomfortable, not because they shove scary-looking things in your face." To achieve this, Salvato developed the façade of a cute setting, which would break down over time along with the behavior of the characters, and eventually the role of one evil character who had seized control of the game from the player would be revealed. In creating the game's horror elements, Salvato drew inspiration from Yume Nikki and Eversion, and emphasized to his team that he wanted the market for visual novels to become much more daring and less reliant on the same plot concepts. The game's characters were based around standard anime archetypes and were given Japanese names to emphasize a pseudo-Japanese atmosphere characteristic of Western-produced visual novels. The sole exception to this format is Monika, who received an English name as a hint to her individual nature compared to the other characters.

Because Salvato lacked artistic skill, he used a free online anime-creation program to create the initial character designs and applied these designs in test versions of the game. Salvato recognized that a product of such quality would not satisfy potential players, so he made a request to his friend, a translator for Sekai Project, for sketches of school uniforms and hairstyles for the characters. Salvato then handed initial visual development over to Kagefumi, who left the project very early on. After Kagefumi's departure from the project, Salvato contacted the freelance artist Satchely, who created the final character sprites over the course of a few months. The sprites were created in several parts to give the poses more variety. The background images were originally created as three-dimensional models, and then processed by the artist VelinquenT.

Salvato also composed the game's score. The introductory composition, "Doki Doki Literature Club!", is primarily performed by piano and flute with accompaniment by string instruments. The composition "Okay, Everyone!" has five different versions, four of which are performed by different musical instruments that represent each of the four female characters. Monika's version emphasizes the piano, Yuri's version uses pizzicato and harps, Natsuki's version is played by xylophone and recorder, and Sayori's is played by ukulele. The game's score is generally calm and serene with the exception of two tracks, "Sayo-nara" and "Just Monika", which are ominous in tone. "Your Reality", a vocal song performed over the end credits, is sung by Jillian Ashcraft.

ReleaseDoki Doki Literature Club! was first released on September 22, 2017, on itch.io, and was later also released on Steam. The game is available as freeware with an optional pay what you want model. Paying a certain amount unlocks a bonus "Fan Pack" that includes desktop and mobile wallpapers, the game's official soundtrack, and a digital concept art booklet. The game's soundtrack was released on two compact discs respectively consisting of 15 and 10 tracks. The first CD contains all the main compositions of the game, while the second consists of remixes and alternative arrangements. On September 28, 2017, Dan Salvato posted an additional Doki Doki Literature Club! music soundtrack piece called "doki17.mp3" to the unofficial Doki Doki Literature Club! Discord server, referring to it as "an unfinished track that never made it into the game" which "[while] pretty far from finished [was] still somewhat pleasant". The soundtrack saw another release by iam8bit on "crimson smoke" vinyl in the first quarter of 2019.

In January 2020, Salvato announced that new content would be added to Doki Doki Literature Club!, but clarified that he was not making a sequel to the game. On June 11, 2021, Team Salvato and publisher Serenity Forge announced that a premium edition of Doki Doki Literature Club!, titled Doki Doki Literature Club Plus!, would be digitally released for the Nintendo Switch, PlayStation 4, PlayStation 5, Windows, Xbox One, and Xbox Series X/S on June 30. A physical version for the Nintendo Switch, PlayStation 4, and PlayStation 5 would also be sold via Serenity Forge's online store. On April 4, 2021, it was announced that PQube would distribute the physical edition of the game in Europe. On the day of the release of Plus, it was announced that the game would be localized and released in Japan by Playism later that year.

The expanded version features a visual upgrade to full high definition, six new side stories, 100 unlockable images, 13 new music tracks by Nikki Kaelar, Jason Hayes and Azuria Sky, and a music player with the option of creating customized playlists or repeating a single track in an indefinite loop. The side stories take place outside the original game's continuity and depict how the club members met and became friends. The game was ported from the original Ren'Py engine to Unity, which allowed the implementation of additional features, and consistent cross-platform development. Physical copies of Plus! were announced to be released on July 30, 2021, but was pushed back to the end of September, and later October, due to the ongoing COVID-19 pandemic.

Reception

The game was received positively by critics, and accumulated a score of 78/100 on Metacritic based on 7 reviews.

Steven T. Wright of PC Gamer described the game as "a post-modern love letter to the genre it represents", and compared its deconstructive quality to Undertale and Pony Island. Robert Fenner of RPGFan noted that traditionally, major visual novel developers such as Key and 5pb. produced lengthy day-by-day narratives of a standard anime protagonist's relationships with their supporting cast. According to Fenner, previous attempts to revise the format, such as Hatoful Boyfriend and Higurashi no Naku Koro ni, could not escape the conventions of their genre and fully reveal their dramatic potential. He then declared that Doki Doki Literature Club! had succeeded in this field by making unusual use of the Ren'Py engine and providing unexpected plot twists.

Reviewers emphasized that the game achieves its surprising impact on the player due to its outward resemblance to typical eroge games: it has a pronounced anime style in its character design, and the game's goal is to develop a relationship with one of the characters. In addition, the characters consist of anime stereotypes whose behavior is sparsely displayed through their sprites, and the game's musical accompaniment is light, bouncy, gentle and playful. According to critics, these aspects combined to create the impression of a standard visual novel that would prompt the player to become attached to the characters. VisualNovelist of Jeuxvideo.com positively compared the game's visual quality to Everlasting Summer, another independent visual novel with the appearance of a professional production. Reviewers pointed out that the game's horror was built on the destruction of a sense of control over what happens in the game and the feeling of helplessness that stems from the distortions in the game's world. Victoria Rose of Polygon stated that this approach was strikingly different from traditional horror games and films, where the viewer remains alienated from what is happening on the screen. Amy Josuweit of Rock, Paper, Shotgun noted that while earlier visual novels have broken the fourth wall by crashing the client or adding extra files, Doki Doki Literature Club! changed the angle by deliberately destroying files rather than adding them.GQs Tom Philip commented that at times the narrative felt like "a slog, clicking through endless amounts of inane, flirty conversation about poetry." Fenner opined that the game did not pass the Bechdel test and positioned the protagonist as a seductive casanova. However, he emphasized that the plot is ultimately a "sharply aware polemic against harem anime/visual novels" in which "the lengths the ladies go to are not wholly because of the protagonist, but rather he can be read as a symptom—an easy outlet." Fenner also felt that the game, like Katawa Shoujo before it, "appears to veer dangerously close to fetishization of very real issues." Ben "Yahtzee" Croshaw of The Escapist described the game as "a nice little idea with a memorable moment or two," but added that the game "doesn't really have anywhere to go once the rabbit's out of the hat." Nevertheless, reviewers recognized the game's plot focus as successful and relevant. 8 Bit Rambles stated that Doki Doki Literature Club! "revolves around love in its most demented and deconstructive form," and characterized the game as an example of postmodern art.

The game has frequently been cited as a satire of the visual novel genre it depicts. Steven T. Wright for Rock Paper Shotgun noted that even as the pastel-tinged game universe splits apart at its very seams the game still "never turns its many knives on you, the player," instead choosing to self-destruct, "cracking open to reveal nothing but artifice." The game has also been viewed by many as a critique of dating simulators and of the people who play them, emphasized by a quote from the creator Dan Salvato, in which he mentions that he wanted to subvert the traditional visual novel stereotype of "cute girls doing cute things."

At IGN Best of 2017 Awards, the game won the People's Choice Award each for "Best PC Game", "Best Adventure Game" (for which it was also a runner-up), "Best Story", and "Most Innovative". IGN also featured Doki Doki Literature Club! on their list of the "18 Best Horror Games of 2017" and subsequently as the 12th scariest game of this generation. Nerd Much? included the game on their 2020 list of the "50 Scariest Horror Games of All Time." The game won the "Matthew Crump Cultural Innovation Award" and was nominated for "Trending Game of the Year" at the 2018 SXSW Gaming Awards. EGMNow ranked the game 16th in their list of the 25 Best Games of 2017.

Cultural impact

In its first three months of release, Doki Doki Literature Club! was downloaded over one million times, and exceeded two million downloads about a month later. The game has inspired numerous fanmade mods, which are also made with the Ren'Py engine. Dan Salvato has reacted positively to the fanmade mods, stating "thanks to the Ren'Py engine, DDLC is excellent and highly accessible for modding, something we hope continues for years to come."

Monika was well-received by fans of the game, becoming one of the game's most popular characters, with several memes (such as "Just Monika") being made about her. Salvato was surprised by Monika's positive reception and massive popularity, stating that he did not expect her to get so popular.

Salvato criticized the "Trapsuki" meme, a theory that Natsuki is actually a "trap" due to her broad shoulders and small chest, calling the meme "really disrespectful" and stating he "doesn't like to joke about people's sex/gender, much less try to convince others that it's not what they think."

On January 1, 2018, the main characters of Doki Doki Literature Club! were added to Yandere Simulator as character skins for the titular character, with Salvato's permission.

Notes

See also

 Milk Inside a Bag of Milk Inside a Bag of Milk Omori''

References

External links
 
 Doki Doki Literature Club Plus! Website
 

2010s horror video games
2017 video games
Freeware games
High school-themed video games
Indie video games
Japan in non-Japanese culture
Linux games
MacOS games
Metafictional video games
Nintendo Switch games
Playism games
PlayStation 4 games
PlayStation 5 games
PQube games
Psychological horror games
Ren'Py games
Self-harm in fiction
Self-reflexive video games
Serenity Forge games
Single-player video games
Video games about artificial intelligence
Video games about mental health
Video games about suicide
Video games developed in the United States
Video games set in Japan
Video games with alternate endings
Visual novels
Windows games
Works about depression
Xbox One games
Xbox Series X and Series S games